Winston is a city in Douglas County, Oregon, United States, located 7 miles southwest of Roseburg. The population was 5,379 according to the 2010 United States Census. It is home to Wildlife Safari.

History 
In 1920, Oregon Route 99 was completed, directly linking Winston with the nearby community of Dillard, which had previously been separated by the Umpqua River.

In 1953, the city was incorporated under the name "Coos Junction". The first City Recorder (Gene Geyer) was employed. The following year, Paul Bender was appointed as the mayor of Coos Junction. In 1955, a new City Charter was approved, and the town was officially renamed to Winston.

The Wildlife Safari was opened in 1972. In 1986, a bronze statue was placed at the triangular junction in the center of town, in remembrance of Khayam, a cheetah from the safari who died of kidney failure.

Geography and climate

Winston has a typical western Oregon Mediterranean climate (Köppen Csb), characterized by dry summers with cool mornings and hot afternoons, and chilly, rainy winters.

Demographics

2010 census
As of the 2010 United States census, there were 5,379 people, 2,140 households, and 1,483 families living in the city. The racial makeup of the city was 92.5% White, 0.3% African American, 1.6% Native American, 0.9% Asian, 0.1% Pacific Islander, 1.1% from other races, and 3.5% from two or more races. Hispanic or Latino of any race were 4.5% of the population.

There were 2,140 households, of which 33.8% had children under the age of 18 living with them, 48.2% were married couples living together, 14.3% had a female householder with no husband present, 6.8% had a male householder with no wife present, and 30.7% were non-families. 24.0% of all households were made up of individuals, and 10.5% had someone living alone who was 65 years of age or older. The average household size was 2.50 and the average family size was 2.87.

The median age in the city was 38.9 years. 24.5% of residents were under the age of 18; 8.1% were between the ages of 18 and 24; 24% were from 25 to 44; 26.2% were from 45 to 64; and 17% were 65 years of age or older. The gender makeup of the city was 48.6% male and 51.4% female.

2000 census
As of the 2000 United States census, there were 4,613 people, 1,753 households, and 1,269 families living in the city. The population density was 2,152.5 people per square mile (832.3/km). There were 1,892 housing units at an average density of 882.8 per square mile (341.4/km). The racial makeup of the city was 94.58% White, 0.15% African American, 1.37% Native American, 0.52% Asian, 0.07% Pacific Islander, 1.24% from other races, and 2.08% from two or more races. Hispanic or Latino of any race were 2.84% of the population.

There were 1,753 households, out of which 37.6% had children under the age of 18 living with them, 52.6% were married couples living together, 15.2% had a female householder with no husband present, and 27.6% were non-families. 21.8% of all households were made up of individuals, and 9.8% had someone living alone who was 65 years of age or older. The average household size was 2.61 and the average family size was 2.99.

In the city, the population was spread out, with 28.8% under the age of 18, 9.9% from 18 to 24, 26.6% from 25 to 44, 20.5% from 45 to 64, and 14.2% who were 65 years of age or older. The median age was 34 years. For every 100 females, there were 93.2 males. For every 100 females age 18 and over, there were 87.3 males.

The median income for a household in the city was $28,939, and the median income for a family was $36,006. Males had a median income of $30,909 versus $18,555 for females. The per capita income for the city was $13,299. About 13.7% of families and 16.9% of the population were below the poverty line, including 24.8% of those under age 18 and 11.8% of those age 65 or over.

Education
Winston is home to the Winston-Dillard School District. The District comprises the Douglas High School, Winston Middle School, Brockway Elementary, McGovern Elementary and Lookingglass Elementary.  Winston is also the home of a K-12 private school, Umpqua Valley Christian School.

Notable people
 Josh Bidwell, professional football player, punter for the Green Bay Packers and Tampa Bay Buccaneers
 Troy Polamalu, professional football player, strong safety for the Pittsburgh Steelers. He played in Super Bowl XL, Super Bowl XLIII and Super Bowl XLV

Sister Cities
Winston has two sister cities:

  Tokoroa, New Zealand
  Rosarito Beach, Mexico

References

External links

 Entry for Winston in the Oregon Blue Book

Cities in Douglas County, Oregon
Cities in Oregon
1955 establishments in Oregon